Miltonia moreliana is a species of orchid endemic to southeastern Brazil.

The species is native to the Atlantic Forest biome (Mata Atlantica Brasileira), within southeastern Bahia to northern Espírito Santo states.

References

External links 

moreliana
Endemic orchids of Brazil
Orchids of Bahia
Orchids of Espírito Santo
Flora of the Atlantic Forest
Plants described in 1848